Hyperventilation is irregular breathing that occurs when the rate or tidal volume of breathing eliminates more carbon dioxide than the body can produce. This leads to hypocapnia, a reduced concentration of carbon dioxide dissolved in the blood. The body normally attempts to compensate for this homeostatically, but if this fails or is overridden, the blood pH will rise, leading to respiratory alkalosis.  The symptoms of respiratory alkalosis include dizziness, tingling in the lips, hands, or feet, headache, weakness, fainting, and seizures.  In extreme cases, it may cause carpopedal spasms, a flapping and contraction of the hands and feet.

Factors that may induce or sustain hyperventilation include: physiological stress, anxiety or panic disorder, high altitude, head injury, stroke, respiratory disorders such as asthma, pneumonia, or hyperventilation syndrome, cardiovascular problems such as pulmonary embolisms, anemia, an incorrectly calibrated medical respirator, and adverse reactions to certain drugs. 
Hyperventilation can also be induced intentionally to achieve an altered state of consciousness such as in the choking game, during breathwork, or in an attempt to extend a breath-hold dive.

See also
Choking game a game which may involve hyperventilation to induce temporary syncope and euphoria
 Control of respiration
 Kussmaul breathing
 List of terms of lung size and activity
 Respiratory alkalosis
 Shallow water blackout, the role of hyperventilation in some drowning incidents

References

External links 

Breathing abnormalities